In philosophy, specifically metaphysics, mereology is the study of parthood relationships. In mathematics and formal logic, wellfoundedness prohibits  for any x.

Thus non-wellfounded mereology treats topologically circular, cyclical, repetitive, or other eventual self-containment.

More formally, non-wellfounded partial orders may exhibit  for some x whereas well-founded orders prohibit that.

See also 

 Aczel's anti-foundation axiom
 Peter Aczel
 John Barwise
 Steve Awodey
 Dana Scott

External links 

 

Mereology
Mathematical logic